Jules Langsner (19111967) was an American art critic and psychiatrist.  Born in New York City in 1911 and died in 1967 in California. Although born in New York, Langsner did not grow up in New York. He and his family moved to Ontario, California shortly after his birth.

HardEdge Colorforms
Langsner has become associated with the term that he coined, along with Peter Selz, "hard-edge painting."

References

 Social Security death index. Accessed August 2, 2010.
 the-Artist.org. Accessed January 17, 2009.
 Kadishart. February 19, 2005. January 19, 2009.
 Kleiner, Fred S. Mamiya, Christin J. Gardner's Art Through The Ages. Belmont Ca.: Thomson Higher Education, 2006.

1911 births
1967 deaths
People from New York City
American art critics
20th-century American Jews
20th-century American non-fiction writers
American curators